Field of Honor is a 1982 board game published by Ragnarok Enterprises.

Gameplay
Field of Honor is a man-to-man simulation of the joust for medieval knights.

Reception
John Rankin reviewed Field of Honor in The Space Gamer No. 55. Rankin commented, "My recommendation: If you like to design games, do so. You might get paid for it. Don't pay a 'professional' game designer for the privilege of finishing his work. It's a bad investment of your time and it encourages sloppy work."

References

Board games about history
Board games introduced in 1982